Silence Suzuka (Japanese : サイレンススズカ, (May 1, 1994 - November 1, 1998) was a Japanese Thoroughbred racehorse who won the Grade I Takarazuka Kinen in 1998. In the same year, his career and life were cut short by an injury suffered during the running of the 1998 Tenno Sho.

Silence Suzuka was the inspiration for a main character of the same name in the 2018 anime Uma Musume Pretty Derby.

Racing career
Silence Suzuka was unbeatable on the turf from 7 furlongs to 10 furlongs, and in 1998 year he was one of the greatest turf racehorses. His career ended when he was euthanized in the middle of the 1998 Autumn Tenno Sho.

Pedigree

See also
 List of historical horses

External links
  The video of the race that Silence Suzuka won
 Silence Suzuka's pedigree

1994 racehorse births
1998 racehorse deaths
Racehorses bred in Japan
Racehorses trained in Japan
Thoroughbred family 9
Horses who died from racing injuries